Devil's club or devil's walking stick (Oplopanax horridus, Araliaceae; syn. Echinopanax horridus, Fatsia horrida) is a large understory shrub native to the rainforests of the Pacific Northwest, but also disjunct on islands in Lake Superior. It is noted for its large palmate leaves and erect, woody stems covered in noxious and irritating spines. In the Squamish language, it is called ch’átyay̓. It is also known as Alaskan ginseng and similar names, although it is not a true ginseng.

Description 

The spines are found along the upper and lower surfaces of veins of its leaves as well as the stems. The flowers are produced in dense umbels  diameter, each flower small, with five greenish-white petals. The fruit is a small red drupe  diameter.

The plant is covered with brittle yellow spines that break off easily if the plants are handled or disturbed, and the entire plant has been described as having a "primordial" appearance. The plants are slow growing and take many years to reach seed-bearing maturity; this makes them very sensitive to human impact as they do not reproduce quickly.

Devil's club reproduces by forming clonal colonies by means of rhizomes. What can appear to be several different plants may actually have all been one plant originally, with the clones detaching themselves after becoming established by laying down roots.

Distribution and habitat

This species usually grows in moist, dense forest habitats, and is most abundant in old-growth conifer forests in the Pacific Northwest. It is found from southcentral Alaska south to Oregon, and eastward to western Alberta and Montana.

Uses

Traditionally, the charcoal from the stalks is still used to make ceremonial and protective face paints, and among the Ditidaht and neighboring groups, it was equally significant to red ochre as a symbolic link to the spirit world. Native American peoples such as the Tlingit and Haida have used the plant as traditional medicine for ailments such as adult-onset diabetes, as well as rheumatoid arthritis.

The plant has been used ceremonially by the Tlingit, Tsimshian, and Haida people residing in Southeast Alaska and coastal British Columbia. A piece of Devil's club hung over a doorway is said to ward off evil. The plant is harvested and used in a variety of ways, most commonly as an oral tea in traditional settings, but also poultices and ointments. Native Americans also dried and powdered the bark for use as a deodorant and used the mashed berries to clean hair.

Because devil's club is related to American ginseng, some people try to market the plant as an 'adaptogen'. The plant has been harvested for this purpose and sold widely as "Alaskan ginseng". Despite some morphological similarities between the araliaceous members Panax ('true' ginseng), Eleutherococcus senticosus ("Siberian ginseng") and devil's club, the different genera are chemically diverse.

Research
An in vitro study showed that extracts of devil's club might inhibit tuberculosis. Another study suggested devil's club may reduce leukemia burden in mice engrafted with murine C1498 acute myeloid leukemia cells.

References

External links

Michigan Natural Features Inventory -- Oplopanax horridus
Edibility of Devil's Club: Visual identification and edible parts of Devil's Club.

Araliaceae
Flora of Alaska
Flora of Idaho
Plants used in traditional Native American medicine
Flora without expected TNC conservation status